Data synchronization is the process of establishing consistency between source and target data stores, and the continuous harmonization of the data over time. It is fundamental to a wide variety of applications, including file synchronization and mobile device synchronization.

Data synchronization can also be useful in encryption for synchronizing public key servers.

File-based solutions

There are tools available for file synchronization, version control (CVS, Subversion, etc.), distributed filesystems (Coda, etc.), and mirroring (rsync, etc.), in that all these attempt to keep sets of files synchronized. However, only version control and file synchronization tools can deal with modifications to more than one copy of the files.

 File synchronization is commonly used for home backups on external hard drives or updating for transport on USB flash drives. The automatic process prevents copying already identical files, thus can save considerable time relative to a manual copy, also being faster and less error prone.
 Version control tools are intended to deal with situations where more than one user attempts to simultaneously modify the same file, while file synchronizers are optimized for situations where only one copy of the file will be edited at a time. For this reason, although version control tools can be used for file synchronization, dedicated programs require less overhead.
 Distributed filesystems may also be seen as ensuring multiple versions of a file are synchronized. This normally requires that the devices storing the files are always connected, but some distributed file systems like Coda allow disconnected operation followed by reconciliation. The merging facilities of a distributed file system are typically more limited than those of a version control system because most file systems do not keep a version graph.
 Mirror (computing): A mirror is an exact copy of a data set. On the Internet, a mirror site is an exact copy of another Internet site. Mirror sites are most commonly used to provide multiple sources of the same information, and are of particular value as a way of providing reliable access to large downloads.

Theoretical models
Several theoretical models of data synchronization exist in the research literature, and the problem is also related to the problem of Slepian–Wolf coding in information theory.  The models are classified based on how they consider the data to be synchronized.

Unordered data
The problem of synchronizing unordered data (also known as the set reconciliation problem) is modeled as an attempt to compute the symmetric difference
 between two remote sets 
Some solutions to this problem are typified by:

Wholesale transfer In this case all data is transferred to one host for a local comparison.
Timestamp synchronization In this case all changes to the data are marked with timestamps.  Synchronization proceeds by transferring all data with a timestamp later than the previous synchronization.
Mathematical synchronization In this case data are treated as mathematical objects and synchronization corresponds to a mathematical process.

Ordered data
In this case, two remote strings  and  need to be reconciled. Typically, it is assumed that these strings differ by up to a fixed number of edits (i.e. character insertions, deletions, or modifications). This is applied in all filesystem based synchronizations (where the data is ordered). Many practical applications of this are discussed or referenced above.

It is sometimes possible to transform the problem to one of unordered data through a process known as shingling (splitting the strings into shingles).

Error handling

In fault-tolerant systems, distributed databases must be able to cope with the loss or corruption of (part of) their data. The first step is usually replication, which involves making multiple copies of the data and keeping them all up to date as changes are made. However, it is then necessary to decide which copy to rely on when loss or corruption of an instance occurs.

The simplest approach is to have a single master instance that is the sole source of truth. Changes to it are replicated to other instances, and one of those instances becomes the new master when the old master fails.

Paxos and Raft are more complex protocols that exist to solve problems with transient effects during failover, such as two instances thinking they are the master at the same time.

Secret sharing is useful if failures of whole nodes are very common. This moves synchronization from an explicit recovery process to being part of each read, where a read of some data requires retrieving encoded data from several different nodes. If corrupt or out-of-date data may be present on some nodes, this approach may also benefit from the use of an error correction code.

DHTs and Blockchains try to solve the problem of synchronization between many nodes (hundreds to billions).

See also

 SyncML, a standard mainly for calendar, contact and email synchronization
 Synchronization (computer science)

References 

 
Fault-tolerant computer systems